The Internationaux Féminins de la Vienne is a tournament for professional female tennis players played on indoor hard courts. The event is classified as a $80,000 ITF Women's Circuit tournament and has been held in Poitiers, France, since (at least) 1994 (with the exception of 2020).

Past finals

Singles

Doubles

References

External links
 ITF search 
 Official website 

ITF Women's World Tennis Tour
Hard court tennis tournaments
Tennis tournaments in France
Recurring sporting events established in 1994
1994 establishments in France